Commiphora wightii, with common names Indian bdellium-tree, gugal, guggul, gugul, or mukul myrrh tree, is a flowering plant in the family Burseraceae, which 
produces a fragrant resin called gugal, guggul or gugul, that is used in incense and vedic medicine (or ayurveda). The species is native to southern Pakistan and western India. It prefers arid and semi-arid climates and is tolerant of poor soil.

Description

The branches are thorny. It is gynodioecious, with some plants bearing bisexual and male flowers, and others with female flowers. The individual flowers are red to pink, with four small petals. The small round fruit are red when ripe.

Cultivation and uses
Commiphora wightii is sought for its gummy resin, which is harvested from the plant's bark through the process of tapping. In India and Pakistan, guggul is cultivated commercially. The resin of C. wightii, known as gum guggulu, has a fragrance similar to that of myrrh and is commonly used in incense and perfumes. It is the same product that was known in Hebrew, ancient Greek and Latin sources as bdellium.

Guggul is used in Ayurveda remedies and it is mentioned in Ayurvedic texts dating back to 600 BC. It is often sold as a herbal supplement.

The gum can be purchased in a loosely packed form called dhoop, an incense from India, which is burned over hot coals. This produces a fragrant, dense smoke. It is also sold in the form of incense sticks and dhoop cones which can be burned directly.

Chemical composition
Over a hundred metabolites of various chemical compositions were reported from the leaves, stem, latex, root and fruit samples. High concentrations of quinic acid and myo-inositol were found in fruits and leaves.

Traditional medicinal use
Commiphora wightii has been a key component in ancient Indian Ayurvedic system of medicine.

The extract of gum guggul, called gugulipid, guggulipid, or guglipid, has been used in Unani and Ayurvedic medicine, for nearly 3,000 years in India. One chemical ingredient in the extract is the steroid guggulsterone, which acts as an antagonist of the farnesoid X receptor, once believed to result in decreased cholesterol synthesis in the liver. However, several studies have been published that indicate no overall reduction in total cholesterol occurs using various dosages of guggulsterone and levels of low-density lipoprotein ("bad cholesterol") increased in many people.

Endangerment and rescue 

Because of its use in traditional medicine, C. wightii has been overharvested, and has become so scarce in its two habitats in India—Gujarat and Rajasthan—that the World Conservation Union (IUCN) has enlisted it in its IUCN Red List of threatened species. Several efforts are in place to address this situation.  India's National Medicinal Plants Board launched a project in Kutch District to cultivate  of guggal, while a grass-roots conservation movement, led by IUCN associate Vineet Soni, has been started to educate guggal growers and harvesters in safe, sustainable harvesting methods.

References

External links

Bjerklie, David (August 25, 2003). "What's Gugul Good For?". Time. 
Flora of Pakistan: Commiphora wightii
Medicinal Plants of Conservation Concern: Commiphora wightii
 Contains a detailed monograph on Commiphora mukul (Guggulu) as well as a discussion of purported health benefits and usage in clinical practice.
, pp. 226–227

wightii
Flora of India (region)
Flora of Pakistan
Incense material
Plants used in Ayurveda